St Anne's Church is a Roman Catholic church at 363 Kennington Lane, Vauxhall, London SE11.

It was built in about 1903–07, designed by Frederick Walters, and has been Grade II listed since 1981. Its presbytery is the St Anne's House next door.

References

External links
 
 

Grade II listed churches in the London Borough of Lambeth
Roman Catholic churches in the London Borough of Lambeth
Roman Catholic churches completed in 1907
1907 establishments in England
20th-century Roman Catholic church buildings in the United Kingdom
Churches in the Diocese of Southwark